The cult of Dionysus was strongly associated with satyrs, centaurs, and sileni, and its characteristic symbols were the bull, the serpent, tigers/leopards, ivy, and wine. The Dionysia and Lenaia festivals in Athens were dedicated to Dionysus, as well as the phallic processions. Initiates worshipped him in the Dionysian Mysteries, which were comparable to and linked with the Orphic Mysteries, and may have influenced Gnosticism. Orpheus was said to have invented the Mysteries of Dionysus.

Dionysus is often shown riding a leopard, wearing a leopard skin, or in a chariot drawn by panthers, and is also recognized by his iconic thyrsus. Besides the grapevine and its clashing alter-ego, the poisonous ivy plant, both sacred to him, the fig was another one of his accredited symbols. Additionally, the pinecone that topped his thyrsus linked him to Cybele, an Anatolian goddess.

Bacchanalia

Introduced into Rome (c. 200 BC) from Magna Graecia or by way of Greek-influenced Etruria, the bacchanalia were held in secret and attended by women only, in the grove of Simila, near the Aventine Hill, on 16 and 17 March. Subsequently, admission to the rites were extended to men, and celebrations took place five times per month. The notoriety of these festivals, where many kinds of crimes and political conspiracies were supposed to be planned, led in 186 BC to a decree of the Senate—the so-called Senatus consultum de Bacchanalibus, inscribed on a bronze tablet discovered in Calabria (1640), now at Vienna—by which the Bacchanalia were prohibited throughout all Italy except in certain special cases which must be approved specifically by the Senate. In spite of the severe punishment inflicted on those found in violation of this decree, the Bacchanalia were not stamped out, at any rate in the south of Italy, for a very long time.

Dionysus is equated with both Bacchus and Liber (also Liber Pater).  Liber ("the free one") was a god of fertility, wine, and growth, married to Libera. His festival was the Liberalia, celebrated on 17 March, but in some myths the festival was also held on 5 March.

Appellations

Dionysus sometimes has the epithet Acratophorus', by which he was designated as the giver of unmixed wine, and worshipped at Phigaleia in Arcadia. In Sicyon he was worshiped by the name Acroreites. As Bacchus, he carried the Latin epithet Adoneus', "Ruler".  Aegobolus, "goat killer", was the name under which he was worshiped at Potniae in Boeotia. As Aesymnetes ("ruler" or "lord") he was worshipped at Aroë and Patrae in Achaea.  Another epithet was Bromios, "the thunderer" or "he of the loud shout". As Dendrites, "he of the trees", he is a powerful fertility god.  Dithyrambos  is sometimes used to refer to him or to solemn songs sung to him at festivals; the name refers to his premature birth. Eleutherios ("the liberator") was an epithet for both Dionysus and Eros. Other forms of the god as that of fertility include the epithet in Samos and Lesbos Enorches' ("with balls" or perhaps "in the testicles" in reference to Zeus' sewing the infant Dionysus into his thigh, i.e., his testicles).  Evius is an epithet of his used prominently in Euripides' play, The Bacchae.  Iacchus, possibly an epithet of Dionysus, is associated with the Eleusinian Mysteries; in Eleusis, he is known as a son of Zeus and Demeter. The name Iacchus may come from iacchus, a hymn sung in honor of him. With the epithet Liknites ("he of the winnowing fan"), he is a fertility god connected with the mystery religions. A winnowing fan was similar to a shovel and was used to separate the chaff from the grain. In addition, Dionysus is known as Lyaeus ("he who unties") as a god of relaxation and freedom from worry and as Oeneus, he is the god of the wine press.

In the Greek pantheon, Dionysus (along with Zeus) absorbs the role of Sabazios, a Phrygian deity.  In the Roman pantheon, Sabazius became an alternate name for Bacchus.

See also
 Apollonian and Dionysian
 The Birth of Tragedy by Friedrich Nietzsche 
 Cult (religious practice)
 Theatre of Dionysus

Notes

References
 Jameson, Michael. "The Asexuality of Dionysus." Masks of Dionysus. Ed. Thomas H. Carpenter and Christopher A. Faraone. Ithaca: Cornell UP, 1993. . 44–64.
Kerényi, Karl, Dionysos: Archetypal Image of Indestructible Life, (Princeton: Bollingen) 1976.
Smith, William, Dictionary of Greek and Roman Biography and Mythology, 1870, article on Dionysus,  
Dionysos cult
Ancient Greek Theater
 Seaford, Richard. "Dionysos." New York: Routledge, 2006.

External links

 
Greek mythology